Shafter can refer to:

People
 James McMillan Shafter (1816–1892), American politician
 William Rufus Shafter, U.S. officer during the Spanish–American War

Places
United States
 Shafter, California, in Kern County
 Shafter, Illinois
 Shafter, Missouri
 Shafter, Texas
 Fort Shafter, Hawaii